Miss America's Outstanding Teen 2013 was the 7th Miss America's Outstanding Teen pageant held at the Linda Chapin Theater in the Orange County Convention Center in Orlando, Florida on August 18, 2012. At the conclusion of the event, Elizabeth Fechtel of Florida crowned her successor Rachel Wyatt of South Carolina. Miss America 2012 Laura Kaeppeler was a host of the event.

Results

Placements

Awards

Preliminary Awards

Non-finalist Awards

Top 5 Interviews

Other Awards

Contestants

References

Miss America's Outstanding Teen
2013 beauty pageants
2013 in Florida